Mount Saint Vincent University, often referred to as the Mount, is a public, primarily undergraduate, university located in Halifax, Nova Scotia, Canada, and was established in 1873. Mount Saint Vincent offers undergraduate programs in Arts, Science, Education, and Professional Studies. The Mount has 13 graduate degrees in areas including Applied Human Nutrition, School Psychology, Child and Youth Study, Education, Family Studies and Gerontology, Public Relations and Women's Studies. The Mount offers a doctorate program, a Ph.D. in Educational Studies, through a joint-initiative with St. Francis Xavier University and Acadia University. The Mount offers more than 190 courses, over 10 full undergraduate degree programs and four graduate degree, programs online.

The university attracts many students in part because of its small class sizes, specialty programs, and location. The Mount has Canada Research Chairs in Gender Identity and Social Practices as well as Food Security and Policy Change. This institution is unique nationwide as it has a Chair in learning disabilities, Master of Public Relations program, Bachelor of Science in Communication Studies, and numerous other programs, faculty, and research initiatives.

History

Established by the Sisters of Charity of Saint Vincent de Paul as a women's college in 1873, the Mount was one of the few institutions of higher education for women in Canada at a time when women could not vote. The original purpose of the academy was to train novices and young sisters as teachers, but the Sisters also recognized a need to educate other young women. Over the ensuing years, the order developed a convent, schools, an orphanage, and health care facilities throughout the Halifax area, as well as across North America.

Architect Charles Welsford West designed the Romanesque chapel and annex (1903–05) at Mount St. Vincent Academy (now University). He served as the Architect, Nova Scotia Public Works & Mines 1932-1950.

By 1912, the Sisters of Charity of Saint Vincent de Paul recognized the need to offer greater opportunity through university education and adopted a plan to establish a college for young women. It was two years later in 1914 that the Sisters partnered with Dalhousie University, enabling Mount Saint Vincent to offer the first two years of a bachelor's degree program to be credited toward a Dalhousie degree.

In 1925, the Nova Scotia Legislature awarded the Mount the right to grant its own degrees, making it the only independent women's college in the British Commonwealth.  By 1951, degrees were offered in Arts, Secretarial Science, Music, Home Economics, Library Science, Nursing and Education.

A new charter was granted in 1966 and the College became Mount Saint Vincent University, bringing forth the establishment of a Board of Governors and Senate. This was also a period of tremendous growth – with enrollment increases, new construction and new agreements. In 1967 the Mount began admitting men as students. The University continued to evolve with the expansion of programs during the 1970s and entered into several new fields, including Child Study, Public Relations, Gerontology, Tourism and Hospitality Management, Cooperative Education and Distance Education. In July 1988, the Sisters of Charity of Saint Vincent de Paul officially transferred ownership of the institution to the Board of Governors.

Caritas Day

After a fire in 1951 burned down Mount Saint Vincent’s solitary building, the people of Halifax came together to support students by providing alternative accommodations for their classes. In recognition of the generosity of their community, the Sisters of Charity established a memorial holiday in appreciation of their gesture. Caritas Day, named after the Christian virtue of charity, takes place on the last Wednesday of January of each year. No classes are held on this day, and students are encouraged to volunteer their time instead. Caritas Day is an opportunity for students and faculty alike to connect with the Sisters of Charity and come together outside of class time in a setting that is both personally and academically beneficial.

Programs

Mount Saint Vincent University offers over 40 undergraduate degrees in the Arts, Sciences and  Professional Studies. Professional Studies programs include Applied Human Nutrition, Business Administration, Child and Youth Study, Family Studies and Gerontology, Information Technology, Public Relations, Non-profit Leadership and Tourism and Hospitality Management. All undergraduate programs are work-experience eligible, meaning any Mount student can take part in a work placement (practicum, co-op, internship) as part of their program.

The Mount also offers diplomas in Business Administration and Tourism & Hospitality Management, and certificates in Accounting, Business Administration, Marketing, Proficiency in French and Non-profit Leadership.

Following consolidation of post-secondary programs across Nova Scotia in the 1990s, the Mount became home to the only education program in the Halifax area. The faculty of Education is home to the only school psychology graduate program in Atlantic Canada. Graduates of this program are eligible to become registered psychologists in Nova Scotia and several other provinces in Canada.

The Mount houses 16 research centres and institutes.

The Department of Applied Human Nutrition has an accredited dietetic program. The University is accredited by a professional organization such as the Dietitians of Canada and the university's graduates may subsequently become registered dietitians.

Mount Saint Vincent University is the only university in Canada to offer a Master of Public Relations program (MPR). The MPR program graduated its first class in October 2009. The Canadian Public Relations Society (CPRS) recognizes MSVU's MPR program for excellence in PR education in its Pathways to the Profession guide.

Support Services 
Academic programs are supported by a wide variety of electronic and print research resources in the MSVU Library.  Research services include drop-in reference assistance, research appointments and classroom workshops.

January 2019 marked the 40th anniversary of the Mount's co-operative education program. It is the longest-standing nationally accredited co-op program in the Maritime Provinces, offering an optional co-op program in 1979 for students in the Bachelor of Business Administration program. Four decades later, more than 8,000 Business Administration, Public Relations, and Tourism & Hospitality Management students have taken their learning from the classroom to the workplace, completing paid work terms in industries related to their field of study (today co-op is a required part of the Public Relations and Tourism & Hospitality Management degrees). Since 2014, the Mount Co-op Office has also enabled experiential opportunities for Arts and Science students through an Arts & Science Internship Program.

Mount Saint Vincent University is home to the Centre for Women in Business, a not-for-profit university business development centre (UBDC), dedicated to assisting with entrepreneurial activities both within the university and throughout Nova Scotia. Founded in 1992 by the University's Department of Business & Tourism, this remains the only UBDC in Canada with a primary focus on women. The Centre has served more than 7500 clients over the past 18 years.

Art Gallery

The Mount Saint Vincent University Art Gallery is located on the first floor of Seton Academic Centre. The gallery opened in 1971 as a resource to Mount Saint Vincent, communities served by the university, artists, Metro Halifax residents and art publics everywhere. Admission is always free of charge.

MSVU Art Gallery reflects the University's educational aims by devoting a significant part of its activities to the representation of women as cultural subjects and producers. Its exhibitions explore various forms of cultural production, highlighting the achievements of Nova Scotian artists and themes relevant to academic programs offered by the university.

Wikuom 

The Mount was the first Nova Scotia university to add a wikuom to its campus facilities. First raised on June 12, 2017, the wikuom is a welcoming traditional Mi'kmaq space where both Indigenous and non-Indigenous communities can gather and learn together.

The Mount is also home to the Aboriginal Student Centre (ASC), which is home to ASC staff who provide academic advising, counselling and other support services to students. The ASC hosts a number of events, including the Mount's Mid-Winter Feast, Blanket Exercises, Cultural Workshops, Mini-Mount Camps, and more.

Athletics

Home to the Mystics, the Mount competes in the Atlantic Colleges Athletic Association (ACAA) in Women's & Men's Basketball, Women's & Men's Soccer, Cross Country and Women's Volleyball. The Mystics hold a championship titles in all sports, making them the most acclaimed team of the ACAA division.

 Women's Volleyball claimed the ACAA title for the 8th consecutive year, February 2019

Notable alumni 
Notable graduates of the Mount include:
 Patricia Arab
 Joanne Bernard
 Carolyn Bertram
 Ryan Cochrane
 Rafah DiConstanzo
 Barrie Dunn 
 Alice Mary Hagen 
 Leroy Lowe
 Catherine McKinnon 
 Paul D. McNair 
 Marianna O'Gallagher 
 Yvonne Pothier 
 Iain Rankin 
 Corrine Sparks

See also 
 List of current and historical women's universities and colleges
 Higher education in Nova Scotia
 List of universities in Nova Scotia
 Canadian Interuniversity Sport
 Canadian government scientific research organizations
 Canadian university scientific research organizations
 Canadian industrial research and development organizations
 List of colleges and universities named after people

References

External links
Official website

 
Universities and colleges in Halifax, Nova Scotia
Universities in Nova Scotia
Catholic universities and colleges in Canada
Educational institutions established in 1849
Former women's universities and colleges in Canada
Catholic Church in Nova Scotia
1849 establishments in Nova Scotia
Women in Nova Scotia